Alyssa Chia Ching-wen (born 7 October 1974) is a Taiwanese actress and television host.  She is known for her roles in television series such as the period dramas The Prince of Han Dynasty, The Heaven Sword and Dragon Saber and Lady Wu: The First Empress, as well as the contemporary social realist series The World Between Us. For her role in The World Between Us, Chia won her first Best Leading Actress in a TV Series award at the 2019 Golden Bell Awards. Two years later, Chia went on to win a Golden Horse Award for Best Leading Actress for the psychological drama film The Falls, directed by Chung Mong-hong.

Career
Chia was educated at Beijing Film Academy but left before graduating due to her attachment to her family and an offer from a company in Taiwan. She was then scouted by an agent and entered the entertainment circleand, advertising for The Taste Of Love, a food company. She also worked as the hostess of children's programs.

She subsequently starred in several television series such as Jia Jiafu and The Chicken and the Duck. Her role in the television series Four Princesses gained her much attention, and after Liang Shanbo and Zhu Yingtai, she has become a well-established actress. Soon she made her foray into the Chinese market and starred in many television series such as The Prince of Han Dynasty, The Heaven Sword and Dragon Saber and Lady Wu: The First Empress.

In 2012, she participated in an ad campaign for PETA, encouraging pet owners to have their dogs and cats spayed or neutered.

Personal life
Chia's ancestral home is in Tianjin, China.

Chia married Charles Sun Zhihao and gave birth to her first daughter, Angelina Sun Ling Qian. Chia and Sun divorced in 2010. They share joint custody of their daughter, while Chia is the main guardian.

On 14 August 2015, Chia married actor Hsiu Chieh-kai and gave birth to her second daughter Hsiu Yun-fei. In 2017, they gave birth to their third daughter Hsiu Si-yu on 15 March; later that year, the couple participated and won the fourth season of The Amazing Race China.

Filmography

Television series

Variety and reality show

Film
Spring Cactus (1999)
Bad Girl Trilogy (1999)
Love's Story Book (2000)
I Must Try to Be a Good Person (2000)
Love Doesn't Go, Love Doesn't Let Go (2013)
(Sex) Appeal (2014)
First Of May (2015)
High Heels (2015)
The Rocking Sky  (2015)
Is There No End (2017)
The Falls (2021)
User Not Found (2023)

Awards and nominations

References

External links 

 
 
 

 

20th-century Taiwanese actresses
21st-century Taiwanese actresses
Taiwanese television actresses
Taiwanese film actresses
Taiwanese television presenters
1974 births
Living people
Actresses from Taipei
Taiwanese women television presenters
The Amazing Race contestants
Reality show winners